St Illtyd's Catholic High School is a coeducational secondary school in Rumney, a district in the east side of the Welsh capital Cardiff. Its catchment area includes the eastern districts of Cardiff and is heavily oversubscribed. The school's namesake is Illtud, a 5th-century Welsh abbot and teacher.

History

St Illtyd's College
St Illtyd's College was founded by the De La Salle Brothers in 1924 to educate boys from the local Catholic community and most pupils were of Irish Catholic descent. The early years of the school were difficult due to minimal funding. Troubles in the local coal industry and the Great Depression meant that many parents could not afford to pay the bare minimum school fees while wealthier Catholics chose to send their children to public schools. During the era of the tripartite system, the College became a voluntary aided grammar school and maintained that status until the system was abolished. It was the last remaining boys' aided grammar school in Wales. Originally located in Splott, it moved out of its cramped school grounds to a new campus overlooking the Bristol Channel in the 1960s. The Lasallian heritage is acknowledged by the five-pointed star and the motto "Signum Fidei" (Latin for "Sign of Faith"), the motto of the De La Salle Brothers, featured in the school crest.

Heathfield House School
Founded by the Sisters of Providence of the Institute of Charity (more commonly known as the Rosminian Sisters of Providence) in 1867, Heathfield House School was the oldest Catholic secondary school in Wales. It was called St Joseph's Grammar School at that time and located at David Street, Cardiff. In 1877 it moved to a building called Heathfield House, which subsequently gave the school its name. In 1953 it became a voluntary aided grammar school. It turned comprehensive in 1968 before becoming a sixth form college nine years later.

Merger
In 1987 St Illtyd's and Heathfield House merged to form the present coeducational school. The sixth form college was abolished as St David's Catholic College was opened instead.

Caer Castell Camp
Caer Castell Camp lies within the grounds of the school. Caer Castell Camp is a motte and ditch scheduled monument and dates back to between 1066 to 1540 AD.

Former pupils

St Illtyd's Catholic High School
Dan Fish, rugby union player

St Illtyd's Boys' College
Dannie Abse, poet
Paul Flynn, MP from 1987-2019 of Newport West 
Peter Gill, playwright
John James, poet 
 Walter Marshall, Baron Marshall of Goring, Chairman from 1982-89 of the Central Electricity Generating Board (CEGB)
Anthony Reynolds, musician and writer 
John Stewart, diplomat and politician

Heathfield House School
Deirdre Hine, physician

References

External links
School Website
Estyn Inspection Reports

Cardiff
Secondary schools in Cardiff
Catholic secondary schools in the Archdiocese of Cardiff
Educational institutions established in 1924
1924 establishments in Wales